Buckley Creek is a stream in Jefferson County, Nebraska, in the United States.

Buckley Creek, formerly called Buckley Branch, was named for William Buckley, a pioneer who settled nearby.

See also
List of rivers of Nebraska

References

Rivers of Jefferson County, Nebraska
Rivers of Nebraska